Cheyenne Crossing (also known as Spearfish Crossing) is a populated place in Lawrence County, South Dakota, United States.

References

Populated places in Lawrence County, South Dakota
Black Hills